Pablo Javier Díaz Stalla (born 5 August 1971) is a former professional footballer who played as a right-back for Sporting Gijón B, Sporting Gijón and Zaragoza. Born in Argentina, he represented Spain internationally at youth levels.

Club career
Born in Buenos Aires, Argentina to a Spanish father who moved to the country in search of work, and an Argentine mother, Díaz played professionally in Spain, amassing La Liga totals of 330 games and six goals over the course of 13 seasons for Sporting de Gijón and Real Zaragoza. He made his debut in the competition with the former on 23 September 1990, coming on as a late substitute in a 3–1 home win against Athletic Bilbao, and scored his first league goal in the following campaign, against the same rival and also at the El Molinón (3–2 victory).

In the summer of 1998, after the Asturians' top-flight relegation, Díaz signed for Zaragoza, remaining with the club until his retirement at the age of 32.

Honours
Zaragoza
Copa del Rey: 2000–01, 2003–04

References

External links

1971 births
Living people
Argentine sportspeople of Spanish descent
Footballers from Buenos Aires
Spanish footballers
Association football defenders
La Liga players
Segunda División players
Segunda División B players
Sporting de Gijón B players
Sporting de Gijón players
Real Zaragoza players
Spain youth international footballers
Spain under-21 international footballers
Spain under-23 international footballers